Jovelyn Gonzaga is a Filipino volleyball athlete. She was a member and team captain of Central Philippine University volleyball team. She is currently a member of the Army Black Mamba Energy Lady Troopers in the Premier Volleyball League, in which she plays as an opposite hitter. She is also a member of the Philippine volleyball National Team.

Career
Gonzaga became Shakey's V-League Season 10 Open Conference Most Valuable Player in 2013. She would later describe the award as a "pleasant surprise". She played as guest player for FEU Lady Tamaraws in 2014.

Gonzaga was chosen Shakey's V-League 12th Season Open Conference best opposite spiker,  Shakey's V-League 12th Season Collegiate Conference best opposite spiker and Shakey's V-League 12th Season Reinforced Open Conference Conference MVP & Best Opposite Spiker.

She was the team captain of Philippines women's national volleyball team that competed in the 2015 Southeast Asian Games.

Awards

Individuals
 Shakey's V-League Season 10 Open Conference "Most Valuable Player"
 Shakey's V-League Season 10 Open Conference "Best Attacker"
 Shakey's V-League 11th Season Open Conference "Finals Most Valuable Player"
 Shakey's V-League 11th Season Reinforced Open Conference "Best Attacker"
 Shakey's V-League 12th Season Open Conference "Best Opposite Spiker"
 Shakey's V-League 12th Season Collegiate Conference "Best Opposite Spiker"
 Shakey's V-League 12th Season Reinforced Open Conference "Most Valuable Player" 
 Shakey's V-League 12th Season Reinforced Open Conference "Best Opposite Spiker"
 2016 Philippine Super Liga Invitational "Most Valuable Player"
 2016 Philippine Super Liga All-Filipino "Best Opposite Spiker"
 2016 Philippine Super Liga Grand Prix "Best Opposite Spiker"
 2017 Philippine Super Liga Invitational "Most Valuable Player"

References

Sportspeople from Iloilo
Central Philippine University alumni
Living people
1991 births
Opposite hitters
Philippines women's international volleyball players
Filipino women's volleyball players
Competitors at the 2017 Southeast Asian Games
Competitors at the 2019 Southeast Asian Games
Competitors at the 2021 Southeast Asian Games
Southeast Asian Games bronze medalists for the Philippines
21st-century Filipino women